Lionel Salem (born 5 March 1937, Paris) is a French theoretical chemist, former research director at the French National Centre for Scientific Research (CNRS), retired since 1999. He is a member of the International Academy of Quantum Molecular Science which named him its annual award winner in 1975 for his work on photochemical processes and on chemical reaction mechanisms.
.

He has contributed to the theories of forces between molecules, of conjugated molecules, of organic reaction mechanisms and of heterogeneous catalysis. He developed the electronic theory of diradicals, as well as the concepts of diradical and  zwitterionic states. In 1968 he described the energy change for the approach of two molecules as a function of the properties of the 
orbitals of the two molécules; this approach, pursued independently by 
Gilles Klopman, led to the Klopman-Salem equation and the theory of frontier orbitals.

He is the author of several books on chemical subjects, including The Molecular Orbital Theory of Conjugated Systems (1966), The Organic Chemist's Book of Orbitals (with William L. Jorgensen, (1973)), The Marvelous Molecule (1979) and Electrons in Chemical Reactions (1982).

External links

References 

Theoretical chemists
20th-century French chemists
Living people
1937 births